The Rice University Press was a publishing house, a division of Rice University.

Relaunched in 2006 after a ten-year hiatus, the press was noted for its unique all-digital platform. Rice's digital press operated just as a traditional press, up to a point. Manuscripts were solicited, reviewed, edited and resubmitted for final approval by an editorial board of prominent scholars. But rather than waiting for months for a printer to make a bound book, Rice University Press's digital files were instead run through Connexions, an open-source e-publishing platform. The technology offered authors a way to use multimedia—audio files, live hyperlinks or moving images—to craft dynamic scholarly arguments, and to publish on-demand original works in fields of study that were increasingly constrained by print publishing.

Users of Rice University Press titles were able to view the content online for free, or order printed books in every style from softbound black-and-white on inexpensive paper to leather-bound, full-color hardbacks on high-gloss paper.

Closure 
In August 2010, Rice University confirmed that the press, despite being digital-only, had become too expensive to maintain. Rice University Press shut down operations on September 30, 2010.

See also
Connexions, the open-source e-publishing platform

See also

 List of English-language book publishing companies
 List of university presses

References

External links
List of publications
Feature in the Wall Street Journal, 13 July 2006

Rice University
University presses of the United States
Book publishing companies based in Texas
Publishing companies established in 2006
American companies established in 2006